The Clonbanin ambush was an ambush carried out by the Irish Republican Army (IRA) on 5 March 1921, during the Irish War of Independence. It took place in the townland of Clonbanin (a.k.a. Cloonbannin), County Cork.

The IRA force was under the command of Sean Moylan and comprised almost 100 volunteers from counties Cork and Kerry, armed with rifles, hand grenades and a machine gun. Their target was a British Army convoy of three lorries, an armoured car and a touring car carrying Colonel Commandant Hanway Robert Cumming. The convoy was travelling from Killarney to Buttevant and comprised almost 40 soldiers of the East Lancashire Regiment.

When the convoy entered the ambush position, IRA volunteers opened fire from elevated positions on both sides of the road. The three lorries and touring car were disabled, and the armoured car became stuck in the roadside ditch (although those inside fired from its machine guns). As Cumming jumped from his car, he was shot in the head and died instantly. Although accounts of British casualties differ, at least two Officers and two soldiers were killed and one policeman wounded.

The battle lasted slightly over an hour. As the IRA forces withdrew from one side of the road, a British officer and six soldiers attempted to flank the IRA on the other side. After a brief exchange of fire they retreated.

The IRA are not believed to have sustained any casualties.

References

External links
The Boys of the Millstreet Battalion Area
article on ambush

Conflicts in 1921
Military actions and engagements during the Irish War of Independence
1921 in Ireland
History of County Cork
British Army in the Irish War of Independence
March 1921 events
Ambushes in Europe